Blase Joseph Cupich (March 19, 1949) is an American prelate of the Roman Catholic Church, a cardinal who serves as archbishop of the Archdiocese of Chicago.

Born in Omaha, Nebraska, Cupich was ordained a priest there in 1975. He was named Bishop of Rapid City in South Dakota, by Pope John Paul II in 1998. Cupich was then named bishop of the Diocese of Spokane in Washington State by Pope Benedict XVI in 2010.  After being chosen by Pope Francis to succeed Cardinal Francis George as Archbishop of Chicago, Cupich was installed there in 2014. He was subsequently also appointed to the Roman Curia's Congregation for Bishops, which plays a role in advising the pope on episcopal matters, including appointments.  Named to the College of Cardinals in 2016, Cupich was additionally appointed to the Congregation for Catholic Education.

Early life and education
Blase Joseph Cupich was born on March 19, 1949, in Omaha, Nebraska, into a family of Croatian descent, as one of the nine children of Blase and Mary (née Mayhan) Cupich. He attended Mount Michael Benedictine Abbey and High School in Elkhorn, Nebraska, and Archbishop Ryan High School in Omaha, Nebraska.  Cupich then studied at Saint John Vianney Seminary at the University of St. Thomas in Saint Paul, Minnesota, obtaining his Bachelor of Philosophy degree in 1971. Cupich went to Rome to study at the Pontifical North American College and the Pontifical Gregorian University, earning a Bachelor of Sacred Theology degree in 1974 and a Master of Theology degree in 1975. He speaks six languages, including English and Spanish.

Ordination and ministry
Cupich was ordained to the priesthood for the Archdiocese of Omaha by Archbishop Daniel E. Sheehan on August 16, 1975.  After his ordination, he served as both associate pastor at St. Margaret Mary Parish and instructor at Paul VI High School in Omaha until 1978. He served as director of the Office for Divine Worship and as chair of the Commission on Youth from 1978 to 1981. Cupich completed his graduate studies at the Catholic University of America in Washington, D.C., obtaining his licentiate in 1979 and his Doctorate of Sacred Theology in 1987.  His  dissertation was entitled "Advent in the Roman Tradition: An Examination and Comparison of the Lectionary Readings as Hermeneutical Units in Three Periods".

From 1980 to 1981, Cupich was an instructor in the Continuing Education of Priests Program and Diaconate Formation at Creighton University in Omaha. He then served as secretary of the nunciature to the United States until 1987, and occasionally acted as spokesman for the mission. Cupich was pastor of St. Mary Parish in Bellevue, Nebraska, from 1987 to 1989, president-rector of the Pontifical College Josephinum in Columbus, Ohio, from 1989 to 1996, and pastor of St. Robert Bellarmine Parish in Omaha from 1997 to 1998.

Bishop of Rapid City
On July 6, 1998, Cupich was appointed as the seventh bishop of the Diocese of Rapid City by Pope John Paul II. He was installed and consecrated by Archbishop Harry Flynn on September 21, 1998.  The co-consecrators were Archbishops Elden Francis   and Charles Chaput.

As bishop, Cupich banned children from receiving their first holy communion in the Tridentine Mass or being confirmed in the traditional form. In 2002, Cupich prohibited a Traditional Mass community from celebrating the Paschal Triduum liturgies according to the 1962 form of the Roman Rite.

During the 2004 US presidential election, Cupich did not join those bishops who said that eucharist should be denied to  Catholic politicians who support abortion rights for women He said, "We cannot cherry-pick particular issues. We have to be willing to talk about all issues. Our position begins with protecting the unborn, but it doesn't end there." Two years later, as South Dakota voters considered a referendum that would ban abortion except to save the mother's life, Cupich called for "public dialogue ... marked by civility and clarity". He proposed three conditions for the conduct of political debate: 1. It must be recognized that both the issue of abortion and legal restrictions on abortion are inevitably moral questions informed by moral values; 2. There should be agreement that any discussion of abortion and the law must recognize both the suffering of the unborn children in abortion and the suffering of pregnant women in dire circumstances; 3. There must be a commitment to dialogue that is civil, interactive and substantial. The statute was defeated 55% to 45%.

Shortly before the U.S. presidential election of 2008, Cupich published an essay in America on the question of race that said:

Cupich served on the United States Conference of Catholic Bishops' (USCCB) Committee for Young Adults during 2000 to 2003, the period when the USCCB adopted its Dallas Charter, establishing procedures for handling accusation of priest misconduct. He served again on the USCCB's renamed Committee on Protection of Children and Young People in 2005 to 2006. Cupich became head of the committee in 2008.

Following the 2008 US presidential election, Cupich advised his fellow bishops to find ways to work with the incoming Obama administration: "Keep in mind a prophecy of denunciation quickly wears thin, and it seems to me what we need is a prophecy of solidarity, with the community we serve and the nation that we live in."

Bishop of Spokane
On June 30, 2010, Pope Benedict XVI appointed Cupich as bishop of the Diocese of Spokane. He was installed as the sixth bishop of the Spokane on September 3, 2010, in a ceremony at Gonzaga University in Spokane, Washington.

In 2011, Cupich discouraged priests and seminarians in his diocese from participating in demonstrations in front of Planned Parenthood clinics or supporting 40 Days for Life, an anti-abortion movement that conducts vigils at facilities that offered abortion services. Cupich later clarified his position through a statement that said that while he wouldn't forbid priests from praying outside the clinics, he believed that "Decisions about abortion are not usually made in front of clinics — they’re made at 'kitchen tables and in living rooms and they frequently involve a sister, daughter, relative or friend who may have been pressured or abandoned by the man who fathered the child.'" In February 2011, when Cupich was heading the USCCB Committee for the Protection of Children and Young People , a Philadelphia grand jury investigation found that the Archdiocese of Philadelphia had allowed 37 priests to remain active despite accusations of abuse or inappropriate behavior. Cupich commented in March: "This is confusing and demoralizing to many people. Everybody is very saddened by this because people are working very hard, each and every day, to implement the charter. And to have this happen is really just painful for all of us." Cupich later called the Philadelphia events "an anomaly". He said the U.S. bishops had implemented much of their agreed upon reforms known as the Dallas Charter (2002) and added: "If we want our people to trust us, we have to trust them. So we are doing our best to make sure that we are transparent with them."In June Cupich again pointed to the Dallas Charter, which he thought needed few modifications. He emphasized the need for proper implementation:

Over the course of three months in 2011, Cupich published "The New Roman Missal: A Time of Renewal", a historical overview on liturgical renewal to introduce the new English translation of the Roman Missal. He wrote favorably of moving from an ad orientem to a versus populum direction of the priest in the Mass; he lamented those who did not accept the changes of the post-Vatican II Roman Missal; he wrote favorably about Communion under both species and Mass in the vernacular, non-Western inculturation into the liturgy, lay participation in the liturgy as a litmus test of active participation, and rubrics simplification.

In April 2012, Cupich supported the decision of Gonzaga University to invite Anglican Desmond Tutu to speak at its graduation ceremonies and receive an honorary degree, against which the Cardinal Newman Society and others active in the anti-abortion movement were protesting.

As voters faced a November 2012 referendum on the legalization of same-sex marriage in Washington State, Cupich wrote a pastoral letter that first noted that the question was often seen in terms of personal sympathy and "a matter of equality":

Cupich then called for "a substantial public debate ... carried on with respect, honesty and conviction" and asked for "careful consideration" of the church's position on the referendum. He concluded with a statement of tolerance that differentiated the Church from opponents of the referendum:

Cupich explained the Church's position on the referendum: that Washington's registered domestic partnerships already gave same-sex couples all the legal rights associated with marriage, so equality was not an issue; that the referendum attempts to make different-sex and same-sex relationships identical, not equal; that it ignores the real differences between men and women and how "sons and daughters learn about gender from the way it is lived by their mothers and fathers"; that removing the terms mother and father from legal documents transforms how we think about family relationships; that the impact on other features of marriage law, such as limiting marriage by relatives or restricting marriage to two people, are unknown; and that the question is not whether a religious or secular definition of marriage will prevail: "Marriage existed either before the church or the state. It is written in our human nature."

Cupich wrote on January 22, 2013, referencing the murder of 20 children in a Newtown, Connecticut, elementary school a few weeks earlier, that "The truth will win out and we have to believe that a nation whose collective heart can break and grieve for babies slaughtered in Newtown has the capacity and God's grace to one day grieve for the babies killed in the womb."

Cupich allowed Catholic Charities employees to help people register for benefits under the Affordable Care Act, popularly known as "Obamacare," in contrast to most other bishops. He said:

In June 2014, Cupich spoke at a conference at the Catholic University of America on the Catholic response to libertarianism, which he criticized in detail:

As an alternative to libertarianism, Cupich advocated some of Pope Francis' views, including his "different approach to how we know and learn" by "making sure that ideas do dialogue with reality" and his call "for a shift from an economics of exclusion to a culture of encounter and the need for accompaniment", in which, he explains, "One encounters another, not one self. This emphasis on encounter and accompaniment unmasks the difficulty with libertarianism, for its stated goal is to increase human autonomy as the priority." He closed by expressing his "serious concerns about libertarianism that impact the pastoral life," the difficulty of counseling young people whose "interior life is at risk in a world that encourages them to be caught up in their own interests". Francis' critique of contemporary capitalism is, in his view, "tethered to a rich tradition of ... challenging economic and political approaches which fall short of placing human dignity in all its fullness as the priority."

Archbishop of Chicago

The Vatican announced on September 20, 2014, that Francis had accepted the resignation of Cardinal Francis George as archbishop of Chicago and named Cupich to succeed him. Cupich was installed there on November 18, 2014. Before his installation in Chicago, Cupich announced he would live in a suite of rooms at Holy Name Cathedral rather than in the Gold Coast district mansion that traditionally served as the residence of Chicago's archbishops.

Cupich announced a major reorganization of the Archdiocese on April 30, 2015. Approximately 50 archdiocesan employees accepted early retirement packages. He appointed the seminary rector, director of the metropolitan tribunal, and chancellor, while confirming Father Ronald Hicks as vicar general and Betsy Bohlen, formerly the CFO, as chief operating officer. A new Hispanic Council (Consejo) was created with headquarters in a church in Cicero, Illinois, in a heavily Hispanic area. In March 2021 the archdiocese announced plans to combine thirteen parishes into five clusters, to minister to regions south of Chicago.

Writing in the Chicago Tribune on August 3, 2015, during the Planned Parenthood 2015 undercover videos controversy, Cupich reiterated Cardinal George's call for "our commitment as a nation to a consistent ethic of life". He wrote that "commerce in the remains of defenseless children" is "particularly repulsive" and that "we should be no less appalled by the indifference toward the thousands of people who die daily for lack of decent medical care; who are denied rights by a broken immigration system and by racism; who suffer in hunger, joblessness and want; who pay the price of violence in gun-saturated neighborhoods; or who are executed by the state in the name of justice." Father Raymond J. de Souza in the National Catholic Register, criticized what he claimed was Cupich's "inconsistent" practice of the "consistent life ethic", offered by Cardinal Joseph Bernardin in the mid-1980s, arguing that it "mainly serve[s] to downplay the urgency of the abortion question". Cupich censured the Illinois Governor Bruce Rauner for approving abortion rights after allegedly promising not to, and at a March for Life rally in Chicago, Cupich said abortion is an important issue and argued that it is in other issues that the Church's witness seems to be deficient, saying "We also have to care about that baby once that baby is born."

On December 27, 2021, following the issuing of the motu proprio Traditionis custodes in July and the subsequent issuing of guidelines released by the Congregation for Divine Worship and the Discipline of the Sacraments in December, Cupich imposed restrictions on the celebration of the Traditional Latin Mass in the archdiocese of Chicago, including banning usage of the Traditional Rite on the first Sunday of every month, Christmas, the Triduum, Easter Sunday, and Pentecost Sunday. Cupich was supportive of the motu proprio Traditionis custodes saying that "the TLM (Traditional Latin Mass) movement has hijacked the initiatives of St. John Paul II and Benedict XVI to its own ends."

Synod on the Family

On September 15, 2015,  Francis named Cupich to participate in the Synod of Bishops in Rome in October, adding him to those proposed by the USCCB. There he supported proposals to provide a path for remarried persons to participate in communion and to respect the decisions that those who remarry or gays in relationships "make about their spiritual lives". Cupich identified himself with those synod fathers who favored a pastoral approach that begins with encountering each person's specific circumstances and highlighted the importance of conscience. He said, "I try to help people along the way. And people come to a decision in good conscience. Then our job with the church is to help them move forward and respect that. The conscience is inviolable. And we have to respect that when they make decisions and I've always done that."

With respect to communion for those in same-sex relationships, he said:

Cardinal
On October 9, 2016, Francis announced that Cupich would be elevated to the College of Cardinals on November 19, 2016. At the consistory held on that day, he was given the rank of cardinal-priest and assigned the titular church of San Bartolomeo all'Isola.

Viganò controversy
On August 25, 2018, Archbishop Carlo Viganò, former apostolic nuncio to the United States, released an 11-page letter describing a series of warnings to the Vatican regarding sexual misconduct by then Cardinal Theodore McCarrick. Viganò also claimed that McCarrick and others "orchestrated" the appointments of Cupich as archbishop of Chicago and Bishop Joseph Tobin as archbishop of Newark. Cupich responded, saying that Viganò told Cupich at the time of his appointment to Chicago that it was "news of great joy," and that Viganò congratulated him and expressed support for him.  Cupich later said, "I don't think that I needed one person to be my advocate."

In an interview on August 27, Cupich said the language of the letter seemed political: "It was so scattershot that it was hard to read if it was ideological in some ways, or it was payback to others for personal slights that he had because there were some people who in his past he felt had mistreated him." Cupich was "taken aback" by the negative language Vigano used with regard to him. In an interview with WMAQ-TV that same day, Cupich said “The Pope has a bigger agenda. He's got to get on with other things—of talking about the environment and protecting migrants and carrying on the work of the Church. We’re not going to go down a rabbit hole on this.” Cupich later stated that his remarks were not referring to abuse by clergy, which must be exposed, reported, apologized for, and ended. When asked about those criticizing the Pope, Cupich responded, "Quite frankly, they also don't like him because he's a Latino."  While Francis was born in Argentina, both of his parents were Europeans who immigrated to that country from Northern Italy.

Restrictions on the Missal of 1962
On December 27, 2021,  Cupich announced how the Archdiocese of Chicago planned to implement the motu propio Traditionis custodes, which was promulgated by  Francis in July 2021, restricting the celebration of Mass according to the Missal of 1962. Effective on January 25, 2022, all priests in the archdiocese of Chicago would be required to request permission from Cupich if they wished to celebrate the 1962 Mass, deacons and other instituted ministers who wished to participate in the celebration of the old rite mass would also be required to have the permission of Cupich. Permission would be required from both Cupich and the Holy See for a celebration to take place within a parish church. In order for Sacraments to be celebrated according to the older form, permission must be sought from Cupich. He also announced that the extraordinary form would not be permitted to be celebrated in the archdiocese, on the first Sunday of the month, at Christmas, Easter and Pentecost and during the Sacred Triduum. In addition to restrictions of the older form, Cupich also announced that any priest who wished to celebrate the Mass of Paul VI ad orientem (facing "towards the East") must first have his permission to do so.
In announcing his restrictions, Cupich also implied that priests who minister to those attached to the old rite, are to accompany their congregations to a return to the celebration of the ordinary form.

In June 2022, Cupich was named to the Dicastery for Divine Worship and the Discipline of the Sacraments. On July 16, 2022. it was leaked that Cupich was planning on shutting down the parishes in Chicago operated by Institute of Christ the King Sovereign Priest, which celebrates mass according to the 1962 missal. Cupich was reportedly planning to revoke the ministry of the priest belonging to the Institute to operate in the diocese starting on August 1, 2022. Since August 1, 2022, the celebration of public Masses and Sacraments at the Institute's headquarters  Shrine of Christ the King are suspended. This decision is believed to have been caused by pressure applied by Cupich.

Other offices
Within the USCCB, Cupich has served as chair of the Bishops' Committee on the Protection for Children and Young People since 2008 and he is a member of the Ad Hoc Committee on Scripture Translation. He has served as a member of the Committee on the Liturgy, the Communications Committee and the Ad Hoc Committee to Oversee the Use of the Catechism. He is also a board member of the Catholic Extension Society and the Catholic Mutual Relief Society. He has served on the board of St. Paul Seminary in St. Paul, Minnesota, as the episcopal advisor of the local Serra Club, and as a board member of the National Pastoral Life Center. He began a three-year term as chair of the National Catholic Education Association in March 2013.

On July 7, 2016, Pope Francis named Cupich a member of the Congregation for Bishops. After being named to the College of Cardinals, Cupich was also appointed a member of the Congregation for Catholic Education in 2017. Members of Vatican congregations normally have five-year terms.

Cupich is the Catholic co-chair of the National Catholic-Muslim Dialogue, sponsored by the Committee on Ecumenical and Interreligious Affairs of the USCCB. He is chancellor of the University of Saint Mary of the Lake in Mundelein, Illinois.

See also

 Catholic Church in the United States
 Historical list of the Catholic bishops of the United States
 List of Catholic bishops of the United States
 Lists of patriarchs, archbishops, and bishops
 Sexual abuse scandal in the Catholic archdiocese of Chicago

References

External links

 

Roman Catholic Archdiocese of Chicago
Roman Catholic Diocese of Rapid City Home Page
 Cupich, Blase J., "We are all a mixture of origins", Chicago Catholic, Archdiocese of Chicago, December 14, 2022

1949 births
Living people
American people of Croatian descent
Roman Catholic archbishops of Chicago
Roman Catholic Archdiocese of Chicago
Roman Catholic bishops of Spokane
Roman Catholic Diocese of Spokane
Roman Catholic bishops of Rapid City
 
Roman Catholic Archdiocese of Omaha
Clergy from Omaha, Nebraska
21st-century American cardinals
Creighton University faculty
Pontifical North American College alumni
Catholic University of America alumni
University of St. Thomas (Minnesota) alumni
Pontifical Gregorian University alumni
Religious leaders from Nebraska
Members of the Congregation for Bishops
Cardinals created by Pope Francis
Bishops appointed by Pope John Paul II
Bishops appointed by Pope Benedict XVI
Bishops appointed by Pope Francis